is an Okinawan band that helped popularize their homeland's musical forms and traditional Okinawan music starting in 1985, when their first hit, "Arigatou", was released.

The band fuses Okinawan folk music, pop, and celebratory eisā traditions to make ballads and dance tunes.

Rinken Band's most recent appearance in the United States was a concert in Oahu, Hawaii. They were featured at the annual Okinawan Festival of 2007.

Members

Discography

Audio CD

Video / DVD

Sources

External links
 Rinken Band website 
 YouTube: Rinken Band "Arigatou"

Japanese rock music groups
Musical groups from Okinawa Prefecture
Musical groups established in 1977
1977 establishments in Japan